The World Group was the highest level of Davis Cup competition in 1991. The first-round losers went into the Davis Cup World Group Qualifying Round, and the winners progressed to the quarterfinals and were guaranteed a World Group spot for 1992.

France won the title, defeating the United States in the final, 3–1. The final was held at the Palais des Sports de Gerland in Lyon, France, from 29 November to 1 December. It was the French team's 7th Davis Cup title overall and their first since 1932.

The breakup of Yugoslavia during the tournament and the declaration of independence by Croatia in June 1991 resulted in top-ranked Croatian tennis players Goran Ivanišević and Goran Prpić leaving the Yugoslavia Davis Cup team. Yugoslavia were subsequently defeated in their next tie, when lower-ranked Serbian players were called up to fill their absence in the semi-finals against France.

Participating teams

Draw

First round

Mexico vs. United States

Spain vs. Canada

New Zealand vs. Argentina

Germany vs. Italy

Yugoslavia vs. Sweden

Czechoslovakia vs. Austria

France vs. Israel

Australia vs. Belgium

Quarterfinals

United States vs. Spain

Germany vs. Argentina

Czechoslovakia vs. Yugoslavia

France vs. Australia

Semifinals

United States vs. Germany

France vs. Yugoslavia

Final

France vs. United States

References

External links
Davis Cup official website

World Group
Davis Cup World Group
Davis Cup